Khaled al-Berry (born 1972) is an Egyptian writer. He studied medicine at Cairo University, but moved to London soon after graduation. He has lived there ever since. He is best known for his autobiography The World is More Beautiful than Heaven, which was translated into English by Humphrey T. Davies. He has also written several novels, including An Oriental Dance which was nominated for the Arabic Booker Prize.

In 2012, he participated in the International Writing Program's Fall Residency at the University of Iowa in Iowa City, IA.

References

Egyptian writers
1972 births
Living people